The Tale of Jemima Puddle-Duck is a book written and illustrated by Beatrix Potter and first published by Frederick Warne & Co. in 1908. The protagonist Jemima Puddle-Duck first appeared in The Tale of Tom Kitten. In 1993, an animated film adaptation of the story was featured on the BBC television anthology series, The World of Peter Rabbit and Friends where it was shown along with The Tale of Tom Kitten.

Plot
Jemima Puddle-Duck is not allowed to keep the eggs she lays at the farm, so she seeks out a nesting place in the forest. A charming gentleman fox talks her into nesting at his house on a mysteriously ample supply of feathers.  He sends the naive Jemima out to collect traditional herbs for stuffing a duck, saying it is for an omelette.  The farm collie, Kep, is able to see through the fox's plan and rescues Jemima. She is eventually able to hatch four ducklings back at the farm.

External links

1908 books
Jemima Puddle-Duck, The Tale of
Fictional foxes
Fictional geese

id:The Tale of Jemima Puddle-Duck
ja:あひるのジマイマのおはなし